Südeichsfeld is a municipality in the Unstrut-Hainich-Kreis district, Thuringia, Germany. It was formed by the merger of the previously independent municipalities Heyerode, Katharinenberg, Hildebrandshausen and Lengenfeld unterm Stein, on 1 December 2011.

References

Unstrut-Hainich-Kreis